Several vessels of the Age of Sail were named Charlotte:

  was an English merchant ship built in the River Thames and chartered in 1786 to carry convicts as part of the First Fleet to New South Wales. She returned to Britain from Botany Bay via China, where she picked up a cargo for the British East India Company. Charlotte then spent most of the rest of her career in the London-Jamaica trade. She may have been lost off Newfoundland in 1818; in any case, she disappears from the lists by 1821.
  was built at the Bombay Dockyard. She spent most of her career as a country ship, trading between India and China. She was wrecked in 1851.

See also
  – one of three sailing vessels of the British Royal Navy named Charlotte

Ship names